Simon John Ward Bingham, 8th Baron Clanmorris (born 25 October 1937), is an Irish peer.

Bingham is the son of John Bingham, 7th Baron Clanmorris, and his wife Madeleine (née Ebel). He was educated at Downside School near Bath, Somerset, before completing National Service as 2nd Lieutenant in 1957–1958. In 1961 he graduated from Queens' College, Cambridge, earning a Bachelor of Arts and later becoming a member of the Institute of Chartered Accountants.

In 1971, he married Gizella Maria Zverkó, daughter of Zandor Zverkó. The two had their only child, Lucy Katherine Gizella Bingham, in 1974. As he has no male heir, the heir presumptive is his second cousin Robert Derek de Burgh Bingham.

References 

1937 births
Living people
Clanmorris